Maria Catharina Daemen (1787-1858), known in religion as Mother Magdalena) was a Dutch nun and the founder of the Sisters of St. Francis of Penance and Christian Charity in Heythuysen, Netherlands. Her surname is spelled as Damen in some sources, and her forename appears variously as Catherine and Katharina, her religious name also as Magdalen.

She was born in Ohé en Laak on 19 November 1787 and died in Heythuysen on 7 August 1858.

Daemen University in New York state, United States, is named for her. The university was founded by the Sisters of St. Francis in 1947 as Rosary Hill College but was renamed to Daemen College in 1976 and later gained university status.

References

1787 births
1858 deaths
19th-century Dutch Roman Catholic nuns